Polański (feminine: Polańska; plural: Polańscy) is a Polish surname. It may refer to:

 Aleksandra Polańska (born 2000), Polish swimmer
 Eugen Polanski (born 1986), Polish-German footballer
 Gabriela Polańska (born 1988), Polish volleyball player
 Henriette Brossin de Polanska (1878–1954), French painter
 John Polanski (1918–1956), American football player
 Łukasz Polański (born 1989), Polish volleyball player
 Roman Polanski (born 1933), French-Polish film director
 Polaris P. Polanski, an alias adopted by Byakuya Togami in the novel Danganronpa Togami, by Yuya Sato

See also
 
 
 Polansky

Surnames of Polish origin
Polish-language surnames